The Ring may refer to:

Arts and entertainment
The Ring (franchise), a Japanese horror media franchise

Literature
 The Ring, a 1967 novel by Richard Chopping
 The Ring, a 1988 book by Daniel Keys Moran
 The Ring, a 1980 novel by Danielle Steel, which formed the basis for the 1996 film
 The Ring, a 1964 children's book by John Updike
 The Ring (magazine), a boxing periodical
 "The Ring" (poem), by Heinrich Wittenwiler
 The Ring: Boxing the 20th Century, 1993 book

Film
 The Ring (1927 film), by Alfred Hitchcock
 The Ring (1952 film), by Kurt Neumann
 The Ring (1985 film), a Romanian film
 The Rings, a 1985 Iranian horror mystery film
 The Ring (1996 film), or Danielle Steel's The Ring, a TV film 
 Ring (film), or The Ring, a 1998 Japanese horror film
 The Ring (2002 film), a remake 
 The Ring (2007 film), a Canadian drama film

Television
 "The Ring" (Angel), a 2000 episode of Angel
 The Ring (Chuck), a fictional spy organization in Chuck
 "The Ring" (South Park), a 2009 episode of South Park
 "The Ring" (Yes, Dear), an episode of Yes, Dear

Music
 Der Ring des Nibelungen ('The Ring of the Nibelung'), a cycle of operas by Richard Wagner
 The Ring (album), by Terri Hendrix, 2002

Other uses
 The Ring in Southwark, London, England, a boxing stadium run by Bella Burge
 Nürburgring, or the Ring, a German race track
 The Ring (rock formation), in Bulgaria
 The Ring: Terror's Realm, a 2000 video game

See also

 Ring (disambiguation)
 The Circle (disambiguation)
 One Ring, a fictional ring of power in J. R. R. Tolkien's Middle-earth
 Ring Nebula, a planetary nebula